Lunn-Musser Octagon Barn is a historic barn located near Garrattsville in Otsego County, New York. Built in 1885, it is a two-story, octagonal wood frame and stone structure with a hipped roof and an octagonal cupola. It measures 60 feet in diameter. and meets the definition of a round barn.

It was added to the National Register of Historic Places in 1984.

References

Octagon barns in the United States
Round barns in New York (state)
Barns on the National Register of Historic Places in New York (state)
Infrastructure completed in 1885
Buildings and structures in Otsego County, New York
National Register of Historic Places in Otsego County, New York